Caccioli is an Italian surname. Notable people with the surname include:

 Blessed Andrea Caccioli (1194-1254), Italian Roman Catholic priest
 Giovanni Battista Caccioli (1623–1675), Italian painter of the Baroque period
 Giuseppe Antonio Caccioli (1672–1740), Italian painter of the Baroque period

Italian-language surnames